French adverbs, like their English counterparts, are used to modify adjectives, other adverbs, and verbs or clauses. They do not display any inflection; that is, their form does not change to reflect their precise role, nor any characteristics of what they modify.

Formation
In French, as in English, most adverbs are derived from adjectives. In most cases, this is done by adding the suffix -ment ("-ly") to the adjective's feminine singular form. For example, the feminine singular form of lent ("slow") is lente, so the corresponding adverb is lentement ("slowly"); similarly, heureux → heureusement ("happy" → "happily").

As in English, however, the adjective stem is sometimes modified to accommodate the suffix:

 If the adjective ends in an i, then -ment is added to the masculine singular (default) form, rather than to the feminine singular form:
 vrai → vraiment ("real" → "really")
 poli → poliment ("polite" → "politely")
 constant → constamment ("constant" → "constantly")
 récent → récemment ("recent" → "recently") (-emment and -amment have the same pronunciation -> /amã/)
 Some adjectives make other changes:
 précis → précisément ("precise" → "precisely")
 gentil → gentiment ("nice" → "nicely")

Some adverbs are derived from adjectives in completely irregular fashions, 
not even using the suffix -ment:
 bon → bien ("good" → "well")
 mauvais → mal ("bad" → "badly")
 meilleur → mieux (the adjective "better" → the adverb "better")
 traditionally, pire → pis (the adjective "worse" → the adverb "worse")
 more commonly, pire → pire (the adjective "worse" → the adverb "worse")

And, as in English, many common adverbs are not derived from adjectives at all:
 ainsi ("thus" or "this way")
 vite ("quickly")

Placement
The placement of French adverbs is almost the same as the placement of English adverbs.

An adverb that modifies an adjective or adverb comes before that adjective or adverb:
 complètement vrai ("completely true")
 pas possible ("not possible")
 trop bien cuit ("too well cooked" or "overdone")

An adverb that modifies an infinitive (verbal noun) generally comes after the infinitive:
 marcher lentement ("to walk slowly")
But negative adverbs, such as pas ("not"), plus ("not any more"), and jamais, come before the infinitive:
 ne pas marcher ("not to walk")

An adverb that modifies a main verb or clause comes either after the verb, or before the clause:
 Lentement il commença à marcher or Il commença lentement à marcher ("Slowly he began to walk" or "He began slowly to walk")
Note that, unlike in English, this is true even of negative adverbs:
 Jamais je n'ai fait cela or Je n'ai jamais fait cela ("Never have I done that" or "I have never done that")

External links

Adverbs